Children of the Mind (1996) is a novel by American author Orson Scott Card, the fourth in his successful Ender's Game series of science fiction novels that focus on the character Ender Wiggin. This book was originally the second half of Xenocide, before it was split into two novels.

Plot summary

At the start of Children of the Mind, Jane, the evolved computer intelligence, is using her newly discovered abilities to take the races of buggers, humans and pequeninos outside the universe and back instantaneously.  She uses these powers to move them to distant habitable planets for colonization.  She is losing her memory and concentration as the vast computer network connected to the ansible is being shut down. If she is to survive, she must find a way to transfer her aiúa (or soul) to a human body.

Peter Wiggin and Si Wang-Mu travel to the worlds of Divine Wind and Pacifica to persuade the Japanese-led swing group of the Starways Congress to revoke their order to destroy Lusitania. By tracing the decision-making trail backwards, they are able to show a philosopher his influence on the Starways Congress.  After several complications, the philosopher persuades the Tsutsumi clan to exert their influence with the Necessarian faction in the Starways Congress to stop the Lusitania fleet. The admiral at the head of the Lusitania fleet, however, disobeys the Congress's order and does what he believes Ender Wiggin, the perpetrator of the first Xenocide, would have done and fires the Molecular Disruption Device (MDD).

Upon Ender Wiggin's death, Jane guides his aiúa to Peter's body, while she is granted possession of Young Val's body, and thus is not destroyed when the ansible shuts down. She is then able to continue transporting starships instantaneously by borrowing the vast mental capacity of the simple-minded Pequenino mother-trees. She transports a ship with Peter and Wang-Mu around the missile, then transports the missile and them to inside of the Lusitania fleet, where it is then disarmed and disabled. Peter and Wang-Mu's efforts finally come to fruition, and the destruction of Lusitania is averted.

Jane falls in love with Miro, and Peter with Wang-mu. Both couples are married under one of the mother-trees of the pequeninos on the same day as Ender's funeral.

See also

List of Ender's Game characters
List of works by Orson Scott Card

References

External links
 About the novel Children of the Mind from Card's website
 

1996 American novels
1996 science fiction novels
Ender's Game series books
Tor Books books
Fiction set in the 6th millennium
Novels about artificial intelligence